"Hold On Tight" is a song written by Australian singer Archie Roach. The song was released in June 1997 as the lead single from Roach's third studio Looking for Butter Boy. Upon release, Roach said "'Hold on Tight' is about holding on a bit tighter and loving someone a little bit more. It's based on a song about two people who went through that problem and now they're holding on tight to each other."

At the ARIA Music Awards of 1997, the song won ARIA Award for Best Indigenous Release.

Track listing

Release history

References 

Archie Roach songs
Mushroom Records singles
1997 songs
1997 singles
ARIA Award winners
Songs written by Mark Seymour